Spiers Memorial Award is presented in recognition of an individual who has made an outstanding contribution to the field of a Faraday Discussion.

The award, given annually since 1929, includes £2000, a medal and a certificate, and recognizes an individual who has made an outstanding contribution to the field of a Faraday Discussion.

References

External links 
 http://www.rsc.org/ScienceAndTechnology/Awards/SpiersMemorialAward/

Awards established in 1929
Awards of the Royal Society of Chemistry
Awards by magazines